The 23rd Street station is a local station on the IND Sixth Avenue Line of the New York City Subway, located at the intersection of 23rd Street and Sixth Avenue (Avenue of the Americas) in Manhattan. It is served by the F train at all times, the M train during weekdays, and by the <F> train during rush hours in the peak direction. This station and 14th Street are the only two local stations on the Sixth Avenue Line.

The 23rd Street station of the IND Sixth Avenue Line shares entrances with the 23rd Street station of the PATH, which is located in between this station's two platforms.

History 

In 1924, the Independent Subway System (IND) submitted its list of proposed subway routes to the New York City Board of Transportation, which included the construction of the IND Sixth Avenue Line. The Board approved the program. As part of the construction of the line, the Hudson and Manhattan Railroad's (now PATH) 23rd Street station had to be rebuilt to provide space for the Sixth Avenue Line's 23rd Street stop, which was to be built at the same level as the Hudson and Manhattan's stop.</p>This station opened on December 15, 1940, as local subway service began on Sixth Avenue from the West Fourth Street subway station to the 47th–50th Streets station, with track connections to the IND 53rd Street Line. The Sixth Avenue Line's construction cost $59.5 million. This station replaced the 23rd Street station on the elevated IRT Sixth Avenue Line, which remained open while construction on the Sixth Avenue subway proceeded, but closed in December 1938.

Ground was broken for two new express tracks between the West Fourth Street and 34th Street–Herald Square stations on April 19, 1961. The express tracks were built  beneath the surface. The construction was done in two portions. The first section was between West 9th and 19th Streets, and the second section was between West 19th and 31st Streets. Although the express tracks, which went into service in 1967, do not serve this station, provisions were incorporated into the design of the tunnel to permit the addition of a future lower level station here without disturbances to train operation.

Under the 2015–2019 MTA Capital Plan, this station, along with 32 others, underwent a complete overhaul as part of the Enhanced Station Initiative. Updates included cellular service, Wi-Fi, USB charging stations, interactive service advisories and maps, improved signage, and improved station lighting. In January 2018, the NYCT and Bus Committee recommended that Judlau Contracting receive the $125 million contract for the renovations of 57th and 23rd Streets on the IND Sixth Avenue Line; 28th Street on the IRT Lexington Avenue Line, and 34th Street–Penn Station on the IRT Broadway–Seventh Avenue Line and IND Eighth Avenue Line. However, the MTA Board temporarily deferred the vote for these packages after city representatives refused to vote to award the contracts. The contract was put back for a vote in February, where it was ultimately approved. The subway station was closed for renovations on July 23, 2018, and reopened slightly ahead of schedule on November 29, 2018. Access to the PATH station was retained during the renovation via the street stairs on the southern side of the station, which are owned by the Port Authority; hence, those entrances were not renovated.

Station layout

This underground station has two tracks and two side platforms. No crossover, crossunder or mezzanine exists to allow a free transfer between directions. The PATH tracks, which were built 40 years before the Sixth Avenue Line, are behind the trackway walls where there would typically be the express tracks would be. The Sixth Avenue PATH tracks are on top of the express tracks used by the B and D, which were constructed in the mid-1960s using a "deep-bore" tunneling method and both sets of tracks are not visible from the platforms. A green trim line with a darker green border runs along both track walls, and appears to be obscured by support beams directly underneath 23rd Street. A similar trim line is present on the platforms walls, though is higher and thus is regularly obscured by the angled ceiling supports. The platform walls also have mosaic name tablets reading "23RD STREET" in white sans serif lettering on a dark green background and lighter green border. Small tile captions reading "23" in white lettering on black run below both trim lines.

On the express tracks on the lower level, the deep-bore tunnel's round shape becomes square below this station and at 14th Street, where provisions for lower level platforms were built.

The 2018 artwork at this station is Stationary Figures by William Wegman. It is composed of 11 glass tile mosaics of Wegman's Weimaraners (a breed of dogs), each of which is wearing different attire.

Exits
The northbound platform has exits on the east side of 23rd Street and Sixth Avenue, while the southbound platform has exits to the west side. Each side of the station has four street staircases on the corresponding side of Sixth Avenue, two to each corner. The station also features direct indoor entrances to the 23rd Street PATH station on both sides; the northbound platform has a direct entrance to the 33rd Street-bound PATH, while the southbound platform has a direct entrance to the New Jersey-bound PATH.

The southern entrances on each side contain simple gray steel fences and are maintained by the Port Authority of New York and New Jersey, PATH's operator, rather than the Metropolitan Transportation Authority, the New York City Subway's operator. The southern entrances appear to be part of the original PATH station, which was built in 1911. The northern entrances on each side contain green-metal fences that are standard to the New York City Subway, with countdown clocks showing the time until the next train arrives. One of the two entrances on each side contain black slabs with digital maps of the surrounding neighborhood, as well as a lighted green bar at the top of the slabs.

The station is near the Flatiron Building, Madison Square Park, Metropolitan Life Insurance Company Tower, and New York Life Insurance Building.

References

External links 

 
 Station Reporter — F Train
 Station Reporter — M Train
 23rd Street entrance from Google Maps Street View
 Platform from Google Maps Street View

IND Sixth Avenue Line stations
Sixth Avenue
New York City Subway stations in Manhattan
Railway stations in the United States opened in 1940
Chelsea, Manhattan
23rd Street (Manhattan)
Flatiron District